Karmaskaly (Qırmıśqalı) is a rural locality (a selo) in Kazadayevsky Selsoviet, Sterlitamaksky District, Bashkortostan, Russia. The population was 593 as of 2010. There are 23 streets.

Geography 
Karmaskaly is located 17 km northwest of Sterlitamak (the district's administrative centre) by road. Roshchinsky is the nearest rural locality.

References 

Rural localities in Sterlitamaksky District